List of active churches and cathedrals in the Syrian city of Aleppo. Note that around 20 churches received varying damage during the Battle of Aleppo, which ended in December 2016.

Armenian churches
Armenian Apostolic Church, Armenian Diocese of Beroea

Armenian Catholic Church, Armenian Catholic Archeparchy of Aleppo

Armenian Evangelical Church, Union of the Armenian Evangelical Churches in the Near East

Syriac churches
Syriac Orthodox Church, Syriac Orthodox Archbishopric of Aleppo

Syriac Catholic Church, Syriac Catholic Archeparchy of Aleppo

Chaldean Catholic Church, Chaldean Catholic Eparchy of Aleppo

Syriac Maronite Church, Maronite Catholic Archeparchy of Aleppo

Syrian Evangelical Church

Greek rite churches
Greek Orthodox Church of Antioch, Greek Orthodox Archdiocese of Beroea and Alexandretta

Melkite Greek Catholic Church, Melkite Greek Catholic Archeparchy of Aleppo

Latin rite churches
Latin Church, Apostolic Vicariate of Aleppo

Arab Evangelical churches
National Evangelical Synod of Syria and Lebanon (Arab National Presbyterian Church)

Christian Evangelical Alliance of Syria

Christian Baptist Alliance of Syria

Further reading 

 Ross Burns & Stefan Knost (2020) "Judayda (Jdeideh) Churches | كنائس الجْدَيْدِة". L.I.S.A. WISSENSCHAFTSPORTAL GERDA HENKEL STIFTUNG (in English and Arabic).

References

 
Churches
Aleppo